The Scene of the Crash is a 1971 Yugoslav drama film directed by Zvonimir Berković.

External links

The Scene of the Crash at Filmski-Programi.hr 

1971 films
Croatian drama films
Yugoslav drama films
Films directed by Zvonimir Berković
Jadran Film films